Palghat Anantharama Bhagavatar was a noted exponent of Carnatic vocal music who lived between 1850 and 1920. He was a native of Palakkad, Kerala and was known for his powerful voice and individual style in singing. He is reported to have sung effortlessly in five octaves, without altering the natural tone and timbre of his voice.

19th-century Indian male classical singers
Male Carnatic singers
Carnatic singers
Singers from Kerala
Musicians from Palakkad
20th-century Indian male classical singers